Miller Publishing may refer to:

 Miller Music Publishing Co., former United States music publisher founded 1906, later absorbed by MGM
 Miller Publishing Company, United States newspaper publisher founded 2002

See also
 Millar Publishing Company, a publisher of comics, see Pete Millar